Kaedi is a department of Gorgol Region in Mauritania.

List of municipalities in the department 
The Kaedi department is made up of following municipalities:

 Djeol
 Ganki
 Kaédi
 Lexelba
 Nere Walo
 Tokomadji
 Tufunde Cive

In 2000, the entire population of the Kaedi Department has a total of 86 836 inhabitants  (41 346 men and 45 490 women).

References 

Departments of Mauritania